Saint Simeon, Saint Symeon or Saint-Siméon may refer to:

People 

 Simon Peter, 1st century AD; first of the Apostles, saint, martyr, first bishop of Antioch and Rome, calls himself "Simeon" in 2 Peter 1:1
 Simeon (Gospel of Luke), the Jerusalemite who first recognised the infant Jesus as "the Lord's Christ" (Luke 2:25-32)
 Simeon Bachos, traditional name of the Ethiopian eunuch
 Simeon of Jerusalem (died 100s), 1st century AD; saint, martyr, and second bishop of Jerusalem
 Simeon, Archbishop of Seleucia and Ctesiphon 2nd century AD Christian martyr, died in 345
 Simeon Stylites (390–459), 5th-century AD Christian ascetic saint who lived for 37 years atop a pillar
 Simeon the Holy Fool, 6th-century saint from Syria
 Symeon the New Theologian (949-1022), Byzantine monk, poet and third of the three Holy Hierarchs
 Symeon of Trier, Sicilian monk, recluse, and saint who died in Germany in 1035
 Stefan Nemanja (1113–1199), 12th-century AD Orthodox Christian saint who unified Serb states

Places

France
Saint-Siméon, Eure, in the Eure département 
Saint-Siméon, Orne, in the Orne département
Saint-Siméon, Seine-et-Marne, in the Seine-et-Marne département
Saint-Siméon-de-Bressieux, in the Isère département

Turkey

Port Saint Symeon, also known as Saint Symeon, the medieval port of Antioch

Canada
Saint-Siméon, Gaspésie, Quebec
Saint-Siméon, Capitale-Nationale, Quebec

Israel 
San Symeon, A known monastery In Jerusalem.

United States, California 
San Simeon

See also
 Saint Simon (disambiguation)
 Simeon (disambiguation)